Boucan-Carré is a commune in the Mirebalais Arrondissement, in the Centre department of Haiti.
It has 48,700 inhabitants.

Geography
Boucan-Carré is a geographic expression is a huge area of land, most of which is covered in mountains and deep valleys. Agriculture and the production of charcoal made from cutting down trees are the primary ways to get by for the locals. The Boucan-Carré River cuts through the center of the town of Chambeau.

Economy
Since the destructive earthquake that struck the Port-au-Prince area in January 2010, many people are returning to family from that city which is causing further strain on the people and land. Clean water is still hard to come by and everything remains very expensive due to devaluation of the Haitian gourde and the extreme stress on the economy in general. All goods are expensive the further away you get from Port-au-Prince. All of rural Haiti is in flux and is experiencing a deep strain brought on by the earthquake.

Infrastructures
Boucan-Carré has seen some massive changes in the early 21st century, with a new primary school completed in 2005, and a secondary school completed in November 2012, and a clinic that has grown into a fully functioning hospital which is supported by Paul Farmer's organization, Partners In Health (known as Zanmi Lasante in Haitian Creole) based out of Boston, MA. The two schools, a church, and a hospital within Boucan-Carré are supported by the Haiti Outreach Program in Knoxville, Tennessee that hosts its annual Give Haiti Hope.

Roads
The UN has made substantial improvements to the roads leading to the area from Port-au-Prince airport (PAP) so that what used to take 4.5 hours to go 45 miles back in 2004, now takes only two hours to arrive in Chambeau.

Telecommunications
Digicel built a large Cellular Telephone Repeater Tower in the commune in about 2008, as locals can be seen riding donkeys while talking on cell phones.

References

Populated places in Centre (department)
Communes of Haiti